Fraserganj is a village and a gram panchayat within the jurisdiction of the Namkhana police station in the Namkhana CD block in the Kakdwip subdivision of the South 24 Parganas district in the Indian state of West Bengal.

History
Sir Andrew Fraser, Lieutenant Governor of Bengal (1903–1908) in the early twentieth century, is credited with the "discovery" of the place. In recognition of his efforts, it was named Frasergunj. There is a dilapidated house near the beach, which according to the locals was the one in which Fraser used to stay.

Geography

Area overview
Kakdwip subdivision has full rural population. The entire district is situated in the Ganges Delta. The southern part of the delta has numerous channels and islands such as Henry Island, Sagar Island, Frederick Island and Fraserganj Island. The subdivision is a part of the Sundarbans settlements. A comparatively recent country-wide development is the guarding of the coastal areas by special coastal forces. The area attracts large number of tourists – Gangasagar and  Fraserganj-Bakkhali are worth mentioning. Gobardhanpur holds a  promise for the future.

Note: The map alongside presents some of the notable locations in the subdivision. All places marked in the map are linked in the larger full screen map.

Location

Civic administration

Police station
Frezerganj Coastal police station covers an area of 34.07 km2. It has jurisdiction over parts of Namkhana CD block. The coastal police stations were formed with the objective of effective policing of the remote areas of the Sundarbans. The police has regular river patrols.

Facilities

Fraserganj has a government operated fishing harbour and a wind energy farm that generates electricity.

Gently rolling waves play on the 8 km long beach from Bakkhali to Fraserganj, the twin places, now forming a continuous locality.

Transport
Fraserganj is on the National Highway 12.

Namkhana railway station is located nearby.

Healthcare
There is a primary health centre at Fraserganj, with 10 beds.

References

Villages in South 24 Parganas district
Tourist attractions in South 24 Parganas district